Aleksije is a Serbian masculine given name, a variant of Greek Alexis and Alexios (Latinized form Alexius). The name Aljoša is a diminutive of the name. It may refer to:

Aleksije Vezilić, Serbian poet
Aleksije Radičević "Branko", Serbian poet

See also
Alexey, Russian variant
Aleksejs, Latvian variant
Aleksej, Serbian variant

Serbian masculine given names